Reza Ray Baluchi (born 1972) is an Iranian athlete and activist living in the United States. He has several times attempted to travel long distances off the East Coast of the United States in a self-propelled water craft resembling a hamster ball, which he calls a hydro pod or bubble.

Background
Baluchi was born in Rasht; and in Iran was tortured and served 18 months of a two-year sentence for offenses against Islam;  he is a Catholic. After cycling for the Iranian national team, in 1992 he defected to Germany, where he was a member of a professional cycling team and cycled through 55 countries promoting world peace. He arrived in the United States in 2002 from Mexico and was granted political asylum after five months in detention. He has set records as a runner and a cyclist, with the aim of promoting world peace. He ran from Los Angeles to Ground Zero in New York in 2003 to dispel misconceptions about Middle Easterners and as a stand against terrorism; ran  around the perimeter of the United States as a fundraiser for Children's Hospital of Denver; ran again from Los Angeles to New York in 2009, acquiring an American flag from the White House; and in 2010 moved to Death Valley, where he ran and trained in the desert heat for two years.

Bubble expeditions
Baluchi built and equipped his first "hydro pod" using $4,500 in savings from working as a mechanic and a dishwasher, at a hookah bar and a supermarket in Newport Beach, California. The craft is a cylinder of 3-millimeter thick plastic in an aluminum frame with paddles and is propelled by his running inside it, like a hamster ball. He estimated in 2014 that he could reach  at sea, and in 2021,  in the  pod he has registered in Florida as a water craft. He has said that he undertakes his ocean journeys to inspire others and to raise money for public services, including the US Coast Guard, which has repeatedly stopped him for his own safety.

2014 attempt to reach Bermuda and Puerto Rico
A Coast Guard crew member described him as "fatigued", and he had activated distress beacons; Baluchi said that he accidentally activated his location beacon retrieving a plastic pack of water bottles thrown to him from a crabbing boat. The rescue, in which a ship, an A-16 helicopter, and a C-130 airplane were launched, cost approximately $140,000; his water craft with his possessions inside was left adrift and ultimately damaged beyond repair being towed back to shore in rough water.

2016 attempts to reach Bermuda
Baluchi spent almost two years working on the crabbing boat to raise $22,000 to build a new hydro pod. In 2015, the Coast Guard denied him permission for another solo expedition. In April 2016, despite a letter from the Coast Guard threatening him with imprisonment and a $40,000 fine if he again embarked on a lengthy water journey without a support boat, he again set off alone from Pompano Beach, planning to travel over about five months to  Jacksonville, Bermuda, Haiti, Cuba, Puerto Rico, and Key West before returning to Pompano Beach. His publicist said that he had not wanted to risk endangering the crew of the support boat.

He made a third attempt in July the same year, which he said was to raise money for abused children.

2021 attempt to reach New York
He said that his objective was to raise money for public services including the Coast Guard, police, and fire services, and for homeless people, and that he had cut his journey short after discovering that his backup GPS device and charging cables had been stolen. A Coast Guard spokesman said that by embarking without a support vessel, he was violating a Captain of the Port Order and could be fined up to $95,881.

References

External links
Reza Baluchi Run With Reza

Converts to Roman Catholicism from Islam
Iranian activists
1972 births
Living people
Iranian male long-distance runners